This was the first edition of the tournament.

Yūichi Sugita won the title, defeating Adrián Menéndez-Maceiras in the final, 6–7(1–7), 6–4, 6–4.

Seeds

Draw

Finals

Top half

Bottom half

References
 Main Draw
 Qualifying Draw

KPIT MSLTA Challenger - Singles